Foam Island is the third studio album by British electronic music duo Darkstar. It was released on 25 September 2015 under Warp.

Critical reception
Foam Island was met with "generally favorable" reviews from critics. At Metacritic, which assigns a weighted average rating out of 100 to reviews from mainstream publications, this release received an average score of 71, based on 8 reviews.

Accolades

Track listing

Charts

References

2015 albums
Darkstar (band) albums
Warp (record label) albums